Mary Persons High School is a public 9-12 high school located in Forsyth, Georgia, United States. It is the sole high school of Monroe County Schools. During the 2011–12 school year, 1,181 students were enrolled in the school. There are around 69 faculty members, giving the school a 17.07 student/teacher ratio.

The 2020-2021 Competition Cheerleading team won the AAA State Championship, held at the Macon Coliseum on February 16, 2021. The team is Coached by Kyle Ward.

Alumni

 Tra Battle, former NFL player
 Harold Clarke, former Chief Justice of the Georgia Supreme Court
 Mario Harvey, former NFL player
 Malik Herring, NFL player for the Kansas City Chiefs
 Alvin Toles, former NFL player
 Peppi Zellner, former NFL player

References

Public high schools in Georgia (U.S. state)